V1000 may refer to:
 Vickers V-1000, a jet-powered cargo aircraft
 Fakel V-1000, a Fakel-designed experimental Soviet ABM of Type "A"
 Bandini 1000 V, a 1970 race car prototype
 Hesketh V1000, a British motorcycle
 Britten V1000, a New Zealand motorcycle
 an anti-riot armored vehicle Bravia Chaimite with water cannon